Christian Pittex (born 1972) from La Forclaz is a Swiss ski mountaineer. He was member of the Swiss national team and is deployed in the Border Guard Corps.

Selected results 
 2002:
 2nd, Diamir-Race (together with Emmanuel Vaudan), Diemtig valley
 2nd, Trophée du Muveran (together with Emmanuel Vaudan)
 3rd, "Valerette Altiski 2000"
 2003:
 10th, European Championship team race (together with Didier Moret)
 2004:
 5th, World Championship team race (together with Alexander Hug)
 10th, World Championship combination ranking
 2005:
 2nd, European Championship relay race (together with Alexander Hug, Jean-Yves Rey and Yannick Ecoeur)
 3rd, European Championship team race (together with Didier Moret)
 4th, European Championship single race
 8th, World Cup race, Salt Lake City
 9th, World Cup team (together with Jean-Yves Rey)
 2006:
 2nd, Adamello Ski Raid (together with Alexander Hug and Didier Moret)

Trofeo Mezzalama 

 2003: 6th, together with Florent Troillet and Didier Moret
 2005: 2nd, together with Florent Troillet and Alexander Hug

Patrouille des Glaciers 

 1998: 5th, together with Alexandre Borghi and Sylvain Gallaz
 2000: 5th (international military teams ranking), together with Pvt Sylvain Gallaz and Pvt Alexandre Borghi
 2004: 4th, together with Florent Troillet and Alexander Hug
 2006: 2nd, together with Didier Moret and Alexander Hug
 2008: 6th ("seniors II" class ranking), together with Benoît Jaquet and Jean-François Cuennet
 2010: 3rd ("seniors I" class ranking), together with Grégory Gex-Fabry and Reynold Ginier

Pierra Menta 

 2005: 6th, together with Pierre-Marie Taramarcaz

References 

1972 births
Living people
Swiss male ski mountaineers
Swiss military patrol (sport) runners